Mono is a language spoken by about 65,000 people in the northwestern corner of the Democratic Republic of the Congo. It is one of the Banda languages, a subbranch of the Ubangian branch of the Niger–Congo languages. It has five dialects: Bili, Bubanda, Mpaka, Galaba, and Kaga.

It is a tonal language.

Phonology 

Tones in Mono: high, low, medium

References

Kamanda-Kola, Roger. 2003. Phonologie et morpho-syntaxe du mono: Langue oubanguienne du Congo R.D. (LINCOM Studies in African Linguistics 60). Munich: LINCOM EUROPA.
 
Olson, Kenneth S. 2005. The phonology of Mono (SIL International and the University of Texas at Arlington Publications in Linguistics 140). Dallas: SIL & UTA.
Olson, Kenneth S. & Brian E. Schrag. 2000. 'An overview of Mono phonology'. In H. Ekkehard Wolff & Orin Gensler (eds.), Proceedings from the 2nd World Congress of African Linguistics, Leipzig 1997, 393–409. Cologne: Rüdiger Köppe.

External links
SIL article on new phonetic symbol for labiodental flap

Languages of the Democratic Republic of the Congo
Banda languages